Idol Poland (season 2) was the second season of Idol Poland. Krzysztof Zalewski won over Mariusz Totoszko and Bartek Hom.

Finals

Finalists
(ages stated at time of contest)

Live Show Details

Heat 1 (4 November 2002)

Notes
Krzysztof Zalewski advanced to the top 10 of the competition. The other 5 contestants were eliminated.
Agnieszka Buła returned for a second chance at the top 10 in the Wildcard Round.

Heat 2 (8 November 2002)

Notes
Hanna Stach advanced to the top 10 of the competition. The other 5 contestants were eliminated.
Paulina Sykut returned for a second chance at the top 10 in the Wildcard Round.

Heat 3 (12 November 2002)

Notes
Agnieszka Szewczyk advanced to the top 10 of the competition. The other 5 contestants were eliminated.
Karina Kalczyńska and Marcin Patyk returned for a second chance at the top 10 in the Wildcard Round.

Heat 4 (15 November 2002)

Notes
Bartosz Król advanced to the top 10 of the competition. The other 5 contestants were eliminated.
Bartek Hom and Katarzyna Mirowska returned for a second chance at the top 10 in the Wildcard Round.

Heat 5 (18 November 2002)

Notes
Marta Smuk advanced to the top 10 of the competition. The other 5 contestants were eliminated.
Joanna Kulig returned for a second chance at the top 10 in the Wildcard Round.

Heat 6 (22 November 2002)

Notes
Mariusz Totoszko advanced to the top 10 of the competition. The other 5 contestants were eliminated.
Kaja Kaźmierczyk returned for a second chance at the top 10 in the Wildcard Round.

Heat 7 (25 November 2002)

Notes
Gosia Kunc advanced to the top 10 of the competition. The other 5 contestants were eliminated.
Damian Aleksander returned for a second chance at the top 10 in the Wildcard Round.

Heat 8 (29 November 2002)

Notes
Magda Rejtczak advanced to the top 10 of the competition. The other 5 contestants were eliminated.
Łukasz Zagrobelny returned for a second chance at the top 10 in the Wildcard Round.

Wildcard round (2 December 2002)

Notes
Damian Aleksander and Bartek Hom received the most votes, and completed the top 10.

Live Show 1 (8 December 2002)
Theme: My Idol

Live Show 2 (15 December 2002)
Theme: Rock, Reggae & Blues

Live Show 3 (12 January 2003)
Theme: Disco & Soul

Live Show 4 (19 January 2003)
Theme: Movies

Live Show 5 (26 January 2003)
Theme: Rock 'N' Roll

Live Show 6 (2 February 2003)
Theme: 20s & 30s

Live Show 7: Semi-final (9 February 2003)
Theme: Top 40 Hits

Live final (16 February 2003)

External links
Official Website via Web Archive

2
2003 Polish television seasons